People v. Bray,  (1975), was a case decided by the California Court of Appeal that allowed ignorance of a grading element to be a defense to criminal prosecution.

Factual background
Defendant Bray was convicted of being a felon in possession of firearms.  Bray did possess two concealable firearms, but his status as a felon was unclear.  Bray had been convicted in Kansas years earlier of being an accessory after the fact, but even at trial it was unclear if this offense was a felony under Kansas law.  Subsequently, when Bray was required to disclose felon status on forms for things like voting, he explained the situation and was allowed to vote in California.

Decision
The Court of Appeal reversed Bray's conviction, allowing his mistake about his felony status to act as a defense to criminal liability.  Under the Model Penal Code, a mistake of criminal law, like one's felony status, is not normally allowed as a defense.  Instead the court treated Bray's mistake about his felony status, a grading element in the statute under which he was charged, as a mistake of fact that was an appropriate defense.

See also
Gun law in the United States

Notes

References

External links

U.S. state criminal case law
1975 in United States case law
California state case law
1975 in California